Chorizanthe angustifolia is a species of flowering plant in the buckwheat family known by the common name narrowleaf spineflower.

It is endemic to California, where it is known only from the coastline of San Luis Obispo and Santa Barbara Counties, but is locally common.

Description
Chorizanthe angustifolia is small, hairy herb.

It sends out prostrate inflorescences along the sandy soil of its habitat, each no longer than about 10 centimeters. The inflorescence is a headlike cluster of several pink flowers, each surrounded by six bracts tipped in hooked spines. The flower itself is only 2 or 3 millimeters wide and white to pink in color.

References

External links
 Calflora Database: Chorizanthe angustifolia (Narrow leaf spineflower)
Jepson Manual eFlora (TJM2) treatment of Chorizanthe angustifolia
UC Photos gallery: Chorizanthe angustifolia

angustifolia
Endemic flora of California
Natural history of the California chaparral and woodlands
Natural history of San Luis Obispo County, California
Natural history of Santa Barbara County, California
Taxa named by Thomas Nuttall